Chand Nawab (born 1963) is a Pakistani journalist from Karachi. Chand Nawab is a popular media personality. Before Joining ARY News, Chand Nawab has been working for different print and electronic media houses. In 2008, a video of Chand Nawab surfaced on YouTube in which he fumbled while reporting Eid festival in Karachi. He went viral on YouTube and on different social media platforms.

Life and career 
Nawab was born in Mirpurkhas, Pakistan. Later his family moved to Karachi. He has done his Masters in Mass Communication from University of Karachi. He also held a diploma in Engineering from Poly Technical College Karachi.

Chand Nawab started his career as a Journalist in various print and electronic media houses. He has been working for some renowned newspapers such as HURRIYET (DAILY) and Daily Morning Special Karachi.  He worked in a well-known news agency PPI - Pakistan Press International.  He joined as a senior reporter for Indus TV Karachi. He had also been working as a reporter 24News HD and 92News. Currently he is working in one of the most popular Pakistani news channel; ARY News.

He has also shown his acting skills in different dramas under AJ and Hum Drama production houses.  He has appeared in different commercials for some of the famous Pakistani brands including KFC, Easy Paisa, BATA shoes, Service Shoes. He also worked in two Pakistani films.

Viral Video of Chand Nawab 
Chand Nawab gained public recognition through a video uploaded in 2008. Chand Nawab was trying to report the Eid festival frenzy on a stairway at a railway station Karachi while repeatedly interrupted by passengers making Chand Nawab much irritated. The unedited video became widely popular on social media. The video got millions of views on YouTube and on many other social platforms. According to Chand Nawab, initially, when the video clip went viral, he had lost all hope to survive in journalism. Just because of the clip, nobody was willing to hire him as a reporter. But all this disappointment ended.

Revival of Popularity and Fame 
The actual popularity of Chand Nawab started in 2016 when his viral video inspired Indian filmmaker Kabir Khan  to create Nawazuddin Siddiqui's character Chand Nawab in his 2015 blockbuster Bajrangi Bhaijaan. Acclaimed actor Nawazuddin Siddiqui recreated Chand Nawab Railway station scene. Once again, the original video of Chand Nawab went viral and it got millions of views all over the world.

Chand Nawab got fame overnight. He got a lot of love and appreciation from India and Pakistan especially from Bollywood star Salman Khan and other cast of Bajrangi Bhaijaan. He did many live interviews for Pakistan and Skype interviews for Indian News Channels as well.  The viral Chand Nawab clip was translated in many different languages. He was offered acting roles in TV dramas. He has also being asked to act in Bollywood movies. Some foreign TV channels. Different Pakistani print and electronic news channels hurried to hire him as their journalist and reporters.

Languages 
Chand Nawab can speak many languages including Urdu, Arabic, Persian, Sindhi, Punjabi, Balochi etc.

References

External links
Chand Nawab's viral video on YouTube

1963 births
Living people
Pakistani Muslims
Pakistani male journalists
Journalists from Karachi